Jaroslav Markovič (born 22 May 1985) is a Slovak professional ice hockey player currently playing for Gamyo d'Épinal of the FFHG Division 1.

Career statistics

Regular season and playoffs

References

External links
 

Living people
1985 births
Slovak ice hockey forwards
HC Dynamo Pardubice players
Tri-City Storm players
VHK Vsetín players
HC Slavia Praha players
Heilbronner Falken players
HK Dukla Trenčín players
HKM Zvolen players
MsHK Žilina players
MHC Martin players
HC 07 Detva players
MHK Dolný Kubín players
HC Prešov players
Dauphins d'Épinal players
Sportspeople from Martin, Slovakia
Slovak expatriate ice hockey players in Germany
Slovak expatriate ice hockey players in the United States
Slovak expatriate ice hockey players in the Czech Republic
Expatriate ice hockey players in France
Slovak expatriate sportspeople in France